Alamgir (born 4 April 1950) is a Bangladeshi film actor and television host. He won Bangladesh National Film Award for Best Actor and Bangladesh National Film Award for Best Supporting Actor a record nine times for his roles in the films Ma O Chhele (1985), Apekka (1987), Khotipuron (1989), Moroner Pore (1990), Pita Mata Santan (1991), Andha Biswas (1992) and Desh Premik (1994), Jibon Moroner Sathi (2010) and Ke Apon Ke Por (2011).

Early life
Alamgir was born on 4 April 1950 at Dhaka Medical College Hospital in Dhaka. His father, Kalim Uddin Ahmed, was an executive producer of Mukh O Mukhosh, the first Bengali-language feature film to be made in Bangladesh.

Career
Alamgir's first film was Amar Jonmobhumi, directed by Alamgir Kumkum. He has worked in television dramas and also as a presenter. In 1986, he made his directorial debut with the film Nishpap.

Alamgir is the host of the game show Houseful on Maasranga Television.

Personal life
Alamgir was first married to lyricist Khoshnur Alamgir. Together they had a daughter  singer Akhi Alamgir and a son Tasvir Hassan. He later married singer Runa Laila.

Filmography

Awards

References

External links
 

1950 births
Living people
People from Dhaka
Notre Dame College, Dhaka alumni
Bangladeshi male film actors
Bangladeshi male television actors
Bangladeshi television personalities
Best Actor National Film Award (Bangladesh) winners
National Film Award (Bangladesh) for Lifetime Achievement recipients